
AD 73 (LXXIII) was a common year starting on Friday (link will display the full calendar) of the Julian calendar. At the time, it was known as the Year of the Consulship of Domitian and Messalinus (or, less frequently, year 826 Ab urbe condita). The denomination AD 73 for this year has been used since the early medieval period, when the Anno Domini calendar era became the prevalent method in Europe for naming years.

Events

By place

Roman Empire 
 Spring – The Roman governor Lucius Flavius Silva lays siege to Masada, the last outpost of the Jewish rebels following the end, in AD 70, of the First Jewish-Roman War (Jewish Revolt). The Roman army (Legio X Fretensis) surrounds the mountain fortress with a 7-mile long siege wall (circumvallation) and builds a rampart of stones and beaten earth against the western approach. After the citadel is conquered, 960 Zealots under the leadership of Eleazar ben Ya'ir commit mass suicide when defeat becomes imminent.
 Pliny the Elder serves as procurator in Hispania Tarraconensis.
 Titus Flavius Domitianus becomes Roman Consul.
 Emperor Vespasian begins conquest of territory east of the upper Rhine and south of the Main. In addition, he reorganizes the defenses of the upper and lower Danube.

Asia 
 February – The Chinese Han Dynasty launches a major campaign against the Xiongnu, whom they confront in the Battle of Yiwulu in the Kumul oasis, an ultimate Han military victory led by General Dou Gu (d. AD 88).
 Ban Chao (Pan-Ch’ao), competing with the Xiongnu, imposes a Chinese protectorate on the kings of Lop Nor and Khotan in the Tarim basin, with the aim of controlling the Silk Road.

By topic

Arts and sciences 
 Martial writes a satire on "military cowardice".
</onlyinclude>

Births 
 Titus Flavius Hyrcanus, Roman aristocrat

Deaths

References 

0073

als:70er#Johr 73